is a Japanese television drama series and the 102nd Asadora series, following Scarlet. It premiered on March 30, 2020 and concluded on November 27, 2020. It was the first Asadora to be recorded in 4K, and the first since Musume to Watashi to be broadcast in only five 15-minute episodes per week Monday through Friday, with omnibus airings on Saturday mornings instead of a fresh episode.

Cast

Koyama's family 

 Masataka Kubota as Yūichi Koyama (based on Yūji Koseki)
 Sera Ishida as young Yūichi
 Toshiaki Karasawa as Saburō Koyama, Yūichi's father
 Momoko Kikuchi as Masa Koyama, Yūichi's mother
 Takara Sakumoto as Kōji Koyama, Yūichi's brother
 Morio Kazama as Mohei Gōndō, Yūichi's uncle and Masa's older brother

Sekiuchi's family 

 Fumi Nikaidō as Oto Sekiuchi, Yūichi's wife (based on Kinko Koseki)
 Kaho Shimizu as young Oto
 Ken Mitsuishi as Yasutaka Sekiuchi, Oto's father
 Hiroko Yakushimaru as Mitsuko Sekiuchi, Oto's mother
 Rena Matsui as Gin Sekiuchi, Oto's older sister
 Toito Honma as young Gin
 Nana Mori as Ume Sekiuchi, Oto's younger sister
 Chise Niitsu as young Ume

Fukushima people 

 Ikusaburō Yamazaki as Hisashi Satō, Yūichi's classmate and childhood friend (based on Hisao Itō)
 Taiki Yamaguchi as young Hisashi
 Aoi Nakamura as Tetsuo Murano, Yūichi's classmate and childhood friend (based on Toshio Nomura)
 Taiga Komie as young Tetsuo
 Naotarō Moriyama as Kiyoharu Tōdō, Yūichi's school teacher

Kitaichi kimono shop 

 Daichi Sugawara as Takahiko Ōgawara, the owner
 Shin Shimizu as Hiroto Kuwata, the shop clerk
 Taketo Tanaka as Shizuo Oikawa, the shop clerk

Kawamata people

Kawamata Bank 

 Kazuyuki Aijima as Gorō Ochiai, a bank branch manager
 Satoru Matsuo as Renpei Suzuki, a bank clerk
 Keiko Horiuchi as Shōko Kikuchi, a bank clerk
 Ayumu Mochizuki as Kanda Matsuzaka, a bank clerk

Others 

 Mayu Hotta as Suzu

Tokyo people

Columbus Records 

 Arata Furuta as Homare Hatsukaishi, the company's director
 Yojiro Noda as Masato Kogarashi, a composer (based on Masao Koga)
 Kayano as Akane Sugiyama, the company's secretary

Bamboo 

 Tooru Nomaguchi as Tamotsu Katori, the owner
 Riisa Naka as Megumi Katori, Tamotsu's wife

Others 
 Ken Shimura as Kōzō Oyamada (based on Kosaku Yamada)
 Ko Shibasaki as Tamaki Futaura (based on Tamaki Miura)
 Takahiro Miura as Takashi Tanaka
 Nozomi Inoue as Fujimaru, a singer (based on Otomaru)
 Hayato Kakizawa as Tarō Yamafuji, a singer (based on Ichirō Fujiyama)
 Mayuko Kominami as Chizuko Natsume

Production 
On April 1, 2020, NHK announced that filming schedules for both Kirin ga Kuru and Yell were cancelled until April 12 to consider the safety of performers and staff during the COVID-19 pandemic. By April 7, NHK extended the cancellation of shooting for both series after Prime Minister Shinzo Abe proclaimed a one-month state of emergency for Tokyo and other prefectures. The series was resumed on September 14, 2020.

Accolades

References

External links 
 Official website (in Japanese)

2020 Japanese television series debuts
2020 Japanese television series endings
Asadora
Television productions suspended due to the COVID-19 pandemic